Flag of Victoria may refer to:

Flag of Victoria (Australia)
Flag of Victoria, British Columbia
Flag of Victoria, Caldas
Flag of Victoria, Chile
Flag of Victoria, Entre Ríos
Flag of Victoria, Gozo

See also 
Victoria (disambiguation)